Daan (formerly transliterated as Ta’An Station until 2003) is a metro station in Taipei, Taiwan served by Taipei Metro.

Station overview

This station is a five-level, elevated and underground station and has two side platforms, an island platform and six exits. It is located at the intersection of Fuxing South Rd. and Xinyi Rd. Four more exits have been constructed with the opening of Red Line. Red Line trains from Beitou terminate here during non-rush hours.

Construction
It also has a  pocket track, four entrances, two accessibility elevators, and three vent shafts. One of the entrances and one of the vent shafts is integrated into a new joint development building. Another entrance and vent shaft is integrated into the existing joint development building on Brown Line.

Public Art
The Red Line station has a theme of "The meeting of light and shadow - a dialogue between ground level and underground". A combination of a horizontal passage which links the space and special illumination and lighting design on the escalators strengthens the directionality of the passage space.

Station layout

Exits
Exit 1: North side of Xinyi Rd. Sec. 3, near Lane 147
Exit 2: North side of Xinyi Rd. Sec. 3, near the Affiliated Senior High School of NTNU
Exit 3: South side of Xinyi Rd. Sec. 3, near Lane 166 
Exit 4: Southeast side of Xinyi Rd. Sec. 4 and Fuxing S. Rd. Sec. 2 
Exit 5: Southeast side of Xinyi Rd. Sec. 4 and Fuxing S. Rd. Sec. 2
Exit 6: East side of Fuxing S. Rd. Sec. 1, in front of Park Taipei Hotel

Around the station
 Bureau of National Health Insurance
 American Institute in Taiwan
 Affiliated Senior High School of National Taiwan Normal University
 Taipei Municipal Da-An Vocational High School
 Daan Junior High School
 Taipei Hakka Culture Hall
 Taipei Farmers Association
 Cross-Strait Tourism Exchange Association
 Daan Forest Park

First and Last Train Timing 
The first and last train timing at Daan station  is as follows:

References

Wenhu line stations
Tamsui–Xinyi line stations
Railway stations opened in 1996